The Meeting International Mohammed VI d'Athlétisme de Rabat is an annual track and field competition at the Prince Moulay Abdellah Stadium in Rabat, Morocco as part of the IAAF World Challenge Meetings. It was first organized in 2008. Its name honours Mohammed VI of Morocco, the present king of Morocco. In 2016 the meeting replaces Adidas Grand Prix in New York for the 2016 IAAF Diamond League season.

Meeting records

Men

Women

References

External links
 Official website

Annual track and field meetings
IAAF Grand Prix
IAAF World Challenge
Recurring sporting events established in 2008
Athletics competitions in Morocco
2008 establishments in Morocco